'Carlo Jackie Paris (September 20, 1924 – June 17, 2004) was an American jazz singer and guitarist. He is best known for his recordings of "Skylark" and "'Round Midnight" from the late 1940s to the early 1950s.

Music career

Early years
Paris was born and raised in Nutley, New Jersey, to an Italian-American family, where he attended Nutley High School. His uncle Chick had been a guitarist with Paul Whiteman's orchestra. Paris was a popular child entertainer in vaudeville who shared the stage with Bill "Bojangles" Robinson and the Mills Brothers. He tap danced from his youth and into his years in the US Army.

After serving in the army during World War II, he was inspired by his friend Nat King Cole to assemble a trio featuring himself on guitar and vocals. The Jackie Paris Trio was a hit at the Onyx Club on New York's 52nd Street.

Recording and performing
He recorded from the 1940s into the 2000s. His albums include Songs by Jackie Paris (EmArcy), Jackie Paris Sings the Lyrics of Ira Gershwin (Time), and The Song Is Paris (Impulse!). The first song that he recorded was "Skylark", on one of two sessions made by his trio for MGM Records in 1947. He recorded Thelonious Monk's "Round Midnight", which was produced by the critic Leonard Feather and featured a young Dick Hyman on piano.

In 1949, he toured with the Lionel Hampton Orchestra and was invited to join Duke Ellington's Orchestra, but he was too exhausted to take it. Paris was part of the Lionel Hampton Orchestra that played at the famed Cavalcade of Jazz in Los Angeles at Wrigley Field which was produced by Leon Hefflin Sr. on July 10, 1949. They did a second concert at Lane Field in San Diego on September 3, 1949. He was the only vocalist to tour as a regular member of the Charlie Parker Quintet. Unfortunately, no recordings exist of the Parker–Paris combination, but there is a photograph of the two working together. He worked often with Charles Mingus, who called Paris his favorite singer and recorded with him often, including 1952's "Paris in Blue" and "Duke Ellington's Sound of Love" on the album Changes Two in 1974.

During the 1960s–70s, Paris frequently performed with his wife at the time Anne Marie Moss.

Paris performed or recorded with Bobby Scott, Charlie Shavers, Coleman Hawkins, Dizzy Gillespie, Donald Byrd, Eddie Costa, Gigi Gryce, Hank Jones, Joe Wilder, Johnny Mandel, Lee Konitz, Max Roach, Neal Hefti, Oscar Pettiford, Ralph Burns, Terry Gibbs, Tony Scott, and Wynton Kelly.

Recognition
He won many jazz polls and awards, including those of Down Beat, Playboy, Swing Journal, and Metronome. In 1953, he was named Best New Male Vocalist of the Year in the first Down Beat Critics Poll. The winning female vocalist was Ella Fitzgerald, who repeatedly named Paris as one of her favorites.

In 2001, Paris played to a standing room crowd – and to a standing ovation – at New York's Birdland jazz club in Times Square. He was virtually the only performer to have appeared at every incarnation of the famed night spot, from the legendary Birdland of the 1950s to the present.

He was praised by comic Lenny Bruce, who shared the bill with him on many occasions. Bruce said, "I dig his talent. The audience loves him and he gets laughs. He is too much!"

Awards and honors
 New Star Male Vocalist, Down Beat Critics Poll, 1953
 Best Male Vocalist, Playboy Musicians & Critics Poll, 1957–1961
 Gold Disc Award, Lucky to Be Me, Swing Journal, 1989

Discography
 Songs by Jackie Paris (Wing, 1956)
 Skylark (Brunswick, 1957)
 The Jackie Paris Sound (EastWest, 1958)
 The Song Is Paris (Impulse!, 1962)
 Sings the Lyrics of Ira Gershwin (Time, 1962)
 Live at the Maisonette with Anne Marie Moss (Differant Drummer, 1975)
 Jackie Paris (Audiophile, 1981)
 Nobody Else but Me (Audiophile, 1988)
 Lucky to Be Me (EmArcy, 1989)
 Love Songs (EmArcy, 1990)
 The Intimate Jackie Paris (Hudson, 2001)

References

External links
 Official website
 Obituary (New York Times)

American jazz guitarists
American jazz singers
American people of Italian descent
Nutley High School alumni
People from Nutley, New Jersey
1924 births
2004 deaths
20th-century American singers
20th-century American guitarists
American male guitarists
20th-century American male musicians
American male jazz musicians